Henry W. Wheeler (September 23, 1841 - April 17, 1904) was an American soldier and recipient of the Medal of Honor who fought in the American Civil War.

Biography 
Wheeler was born in Fort Smith, Arkansas on September 23, 1841. He joined the 2nd Maine Volunteer Infantry as a private on April 25, 1861. Wheeler earned his Medal of Honor during the First Battle of Bull Run, Virginia on July 21, 1861. In August 1866, Wheeler received a brevet rank of captain for his actions during the war. Henry Wheeler died on April 17, 1904, and is now interred in Arlington National Cemetery in section 3, plot 1496.

Medal of Honor Citations 
For extraordinary heroism on 21 July 1861, in action at Bull Run, Virginia. Private Wheeler voluntarily accompanied his commanding officer and assisted in removing the dead and wounded from the field under a heavy fire of artillery and musketry.

References 

1841 births
1904 deaths
American Civil War recipients of the Medal of Honor
United States Army Medal of Honor recipients
People of Arkansas in the American Civil War